The 2008 Tour de Romandie (62nd Edition) cycling road race took place from 29 April to 4 May 2008 in Switzerland. It is the sixth race of the 2008 UCI ProTour.

Stages

Prologue - 29 April 2008: Genève > Genève, 1.9 km (ITT)

Stage 1 - 30 April 2008: Morges > Saignelégier, 182.4 km

Stage 2 - 1 May 2008: Moutier > Fribourg, 170 km

Stage 3 - 2 May 2008: Sion > Sion, 18.8 km (ITT)

Stage 4 - 3 May 2008: Sion > Zinal, 112.4 km
A landslide forced the organizers to cancel the third climb of the day, Saint-Luc, and the route was shortened to 112.4 km.

Stage 5 - 4 May 2008: Le Bouveret > Lausanne, 159.4 km

Final standings

General classification

Mountain classification

Points classification

Sprints classification

Jersey progress

Individual 2008 UCI ProTour standings after race
As of 4 May 2008, after the 2008 Tour de Romandie.

 62 riders have scored at least one point on the 2008 UCI ProTour.

See also
2008 in road cycling

References

External links
  
cyclingnews.com

2008 in road cycling
2008 in Swiss sport
2008 UCI ProTour
2008